Arpa or ARPA may refer to:

Given name
 Arpa Ke'un (died 1336), Ilkhan during the disintegration of the Mongol state in Persia

Surname
 José Arpa (1858–1952), Spanish artist who worked in Spain, Mexico, and Texas
 Okay Arpa (born 1977), Turkish karateka
 Yvan Arpa, Swiss watch designer

Geographical names
 Areni, formerly Arpa, a village in Armenia
 Arpi, Armenia, also known as Arpa, a town in Armenia
 Arpa (river), in Armenia
 Arpa (river), Chhattisgarh in Chhattisgarh, India
 Akhurian River, Arpa in Turkish, river in Turkey and Armenia
 Arpa Darreh, a village in Iran
 Arpa Valley, a high-altitude valley in Kyrgyzstan

Music 
 Arpa d'Eolo, a musical instrument
 Arpa jarocha, a Mexican harp used in conjunto jarocho music
 Rinaldo dall'Arpa (died 1603), Italian composer, singer, and harpist

Acronym
 Advanced Research Projects Agency, former name of the US Defense Advanced Research Projects Agency
 ARPA-E, the Advanced Research Projects Agency-Energy, an agency created in 2007 within the US Department of Energy
 HSARPA, the Homeland Security Advanced Research Projects Agency, an agency within the Science and Technology Directorate at the US Department of Homeland Security
 IARPA, the Intelligence Advanced Research Projects Activity, an organization within the Office of the Director of National Intelligence
 .arpa (address and routing parameter area), a top-level domain in the Domain Name System of the Internet
 Advanced Research Projects Agency, the precursor agency to DARPA
 Aerolíneas Paraguayas, a former Paraguayan airline
 Agenzie Regionali per la Protezione Ambientale, the Italian Regional Environmental Protection Agency
 Amazon Region Protected Areas Program, an initiative to expand protection of the Amazon rainforest in Brazil
 Archaeological Resources Protection Act of 1979, a federal law of the United States
 Automatic radar plotting aid, a capability of some marine radar systems
 Arctic Research and Policy Act of 1984 (amended 1990)
 Average revenue per account, a metric similar to average revenue per user
 American Rescue Plan Act of 2021, an economic stimulus program of the United States

Other uses
 Arpa Yeghegnadzor, an inactive Armenian football club
 Arpa şehriye, Turkish for orzo

See also 
 Arpa Chai (disambiguation)